Elections to the Madhya Pradesh Legislative Assembly were held in November 1998. The Indian National Congress won a majority of seats and Digvijaya Singh was sworn in as the new Chief Minister for the second time.

These were the last elections to the legislative assembly before the passage of the Madhya Pradesh Reorganisation Act, 2000, which carved out the new state of Chhattisgarh from Madhya Pradesh. From the 320 seats in the undivided legislative assembly, the new Chhattisgarh Legislative Assembly was assigned 90 Seats, while Madhya Pradesh was left with the remaining 230 seats.

Result 
Source:

Elected Members

The Kanshiram - BSP twist 

BJP was constantly increasing their seat count, in the aftermath of the Ayodhya Demolition, and so was BSP under the leadership of Kanshiram, who was leading a silent revolution among the Dalits, Tribals and OBCs, for electorally capturing power in the government, and to work for self-upliftment. Both the parties were a concern for the congress, but not BJP as much as the BSP was. The reason was that the vote base of Congress and BSP was the same, which meant that even a fractional shift of voters from Congress to BSP would have costed Congress many seats. The fiercely contested election can be understood by the fact that the vote difference of Congress and the BJP was merely 1.31%.

To the surprise of all, Kanshiram during his election rally announced that "BJP was jumping with happiness that Kanshiram would fight elections in Madhya Pradesh without any alliance, that's why I have decided only to contest election in those seats in which we can damage Congress, enough to win the seat and in the rest of seats I would ask you all to vote for the strongest party against BJP, we can't let them win the elections". True to his words, BSP fought elections only in 170 seats, as compared to 286 during the last elections. They retaining all the 11 seats they won last election.

References 

1998
1998
Madhya